Workers Trust and Merchant Bank Ltd v Dojap Investments Ltd [1993] UKPC 7 is a contract law case of the Judicial Committee of the Privy Council, on appeal from the Court of Appeal of Jamaica. The case concerns the dividing line between a penal requirement for a deposit and liquidated damages.

Facts
A contract for buying a house said time was of the essence. The sellers said the 25% deposit was forfeit after the buyers failed to pay the balance in 14 days as the contract required. The buyers tried to send the balance in a week later with interest. The deposit was a Jamaican $3m.

Judgment
The Privy Council advised that the sellers could not retain the deposit, and must return, subtracting any loss they could prove they suffered. Lord Browne-Wilkinson said it was "not possible for the parties to attach the incidents of a deposit to the payment of a sum of money unless such sum is reasonable as earnest money." A reasonable deposit would be 10 per cent, and if higher the seller "must show special circumstances which justify such a deposit." This was so even though 10 per cent in itself was "without logic", but it was a good benchmark.

See also
English contract law

Notes

References

Contract case law
Judicial Committee of the Privy Council cases on appeal from Jamaica
1993 in British law
1993 in Jamaica
1993 in case law